is a town located in Kamikawa Subprefecture, Hokkaido, Japan.

As of September 2016, the town has an estimated population of 2,611 and a density of 3.9 persons per km2. The total area is 665.52 km2.

Culture

Mascot

She is a girl who wears a helmet resembling a curling rock and her clothes and hairclips resembles carrots and her bag resembles corn. She is unveiled in 2018.

References

External links

Official Website 

Towns in Hokkaido